Carl Diercke (born 15 September  1842 in Kyritz, Ostprignitz; died 7 March 1913 in Berlin) was a German cartographer.

Life 
From 1863 to 1865, Diercke studied in Berlin. In 1875, Diercke started German geography atlas Diercke. Diercke was the first in the world to develop a world atlas without leaving his birth country

In 1871, he married Hermine Marie Ottilie Lucas.

Legacy 

Literature 
 Jürgen Espenhorst, Erhard Kümpel: Diercke, ein Atlas für Generationen. Hintergründe, Geschichte und bibliographische Angaben bis 1955. Pangaea-Verlag, Schwerte 1999, .

See also 
 Cartographic propaganda, the use of atlases for political purposes, as was common in Diercke's time
 Velhagen & Klasing, a publisher of another popular school atlas
 Westermann Verlag, a publishing company that continues to publish versions of Diercke's school atlas.

Notes

References

External links 

Websites for the active Diercke imprint at Westermann Gruppe:
 German website
 English website
 Imprint page at the Westermann Gruppe website

German cartographers
Atlases
1842 births
1913 deaths